Jennie Wolf Creek is a  long 2nd order tributary to Dutch Buffalo Creek in Cabarrus County, North Carolina.  This is the only stream of this name in the United States.

Variant names
According to the Geographic Names Information System, it has also been known historically as:
Schene Wolf Creek

Course
Jennie Wolf Creek rises about 2 miles south-southeast of Shupings Mill, North Carolina in Rowan County, and then flows south-southeast into Cabarrus County to join Dutch Buffalo Creek about 2 miles south of Watts Crossroads.

Watershed
Jennie Wolf Creek drains  of area, receives about 46.9 in/year of precipitation, has a wetness index of 435.87, and is about 54% forested.

References

Rivers of North Carolina
Rivers of Cabarrus County, North Carolina
Rivers of Rowan County, North Carolina